Arvid Karlsteen (16 March 1647 – 3 May 1718) was a Swedish medal engraver and portrait miniaturist.

Born on March 16, 1647, on a farm near Karlskoga. Karlsteen was the son of Jonas Kjellander, a cartographer, and his wife Brita Larsdotter von Sacken. He was ennobled in 1692.

Married Magdalena Elisabet Schenkowitz in 1674 and had issue.

References

External links 

 

1647 births
1718 deaths
17th-century engravers
18th-century engravers
Swedish engravers
Portrait miniaturists
People from Karlskoga Municipality